Ultimate Prince is a greatest hits album by American recording artist Prince. It was released on August 22, 2006, by Warner Bros. Records. The two-disc set contains a disc of some previously released hits (some in single edit form; only "My Name Is Prince" had not been on a previous hits collection), and another of extended remixes of hits and a B-side, most of which had only been previously released as 12-inch singles.

Release date controversy
The album was originally slated to be released in North America on March 14, 2006, but was canceled just days before its release. This is likely due to Prince not wanting competition with his new 3121, scheduled to be released only one week later. However, promo copies of the album had already been sent to some retailers and were sold before the album's recall. A second release date of May 22 was proposed, but was again canceled and the album's future was unknown for a time. Three months later, it was officially released on August 22, 2006, to generally positive reviews.

Commercial performance
The album debuted at number 61 on the Billboard 200 the week of September 9, 2006; the next week it dropped to number one hundred twenty-three. It remained on the chart for sixteen weeks.

The week following Prince's death the album sold 40,000 units and hit a new peak of four on the Billboard 200 during the week of May 14, 2016; it was the first time that Ultimate rose into the top 10 of the chart.

In the United Kingdom the album opened at number 24 on September 2, 2006; the next week, it fell to number 29 and left the chart three weeks later. Almost one year later, it re-entered at number 6 during the week of August 11, 2007. The week following Prince's death, the album re-entered on the chart at number 10 and the next week; on May 5, 2016, it reached and peaked at number three. Ultimate remained on the UK Albums Chart for twenty seven weeks. It was certified platinum by the BPI on January 24, 2014, denoting shipments of 300,000 units.

Track listing

Personnel
Adapted from the AllMusic credits.

 Annette Atkinson – standup bass
 Tommy Barbarella – sampling
 Timothy Barr – standup bass
 Don Batts – engineer
 Allen Beaulieu – Photography
 Steve Beltran – mixing
 Mathieu Bitton – art direction, creative director, Design
 Joe Blaney – engineer, mixing
 Atlanta Bliss – brass, Trumpet, vocals
 Boni Boyer – Hammond organ, vocals
 Gary Brandt – engineer
 Denyse Buffum – viola
 Keith "KC" Cohen – mixing
 David Daoud Coleman – cello
 Lisa Coleman – keyboards, vocals
 David Z. – arranger
 Damon Dickson – Percussion, background vocals
 Dr. Fink – keyboards
 Shelia E – Guest Artist
 Sheena Easton – vocals
 Mark Ettel – assistant engineer
 Dave Friedlander – engineer
 Lowell Fulson – Composer
 Rosie Gaines – organ, Sampling, vocals, background vocals
 Tom Garneau – engineer, mixing
 Ron Garrett – remix Assistant
 Mick Guzauski – engineer, remixing
 Ray Hahnfeldt – engineer
 Michael Hutchinson – engineer, remixing
 Coke Johnson – engineer
 Suzie Katayama – cello
 Jeff Katz – Photography
 Michael Koppelman – engineer, mixing
 Matt Larson – engineer
 Eric Leeds – brass, Flute, Saxophone, vocals
 David Leonard – engineer
 Tony M. – Rap, background vocals
 Peggy Mac – engineer
 Jimmy McCracklin – Composer
 Peggy McCreary – engineer, mixing
 Wendy Melvoin – guitar, vocals
 Michael B. – Drums
 Eddie Miller – engineer, mixing
 Bob Mockler – engineer, remixing
 New Power Generation – guest artist
 Steve Noonan – engineer
 Novi Novog – viola, violin
 Sid Page – violin
 Ross Pallone – engineer
 Tim Penn – engineer
 Shep Pettibone – Editing, producer, remixing
 Brian Poer – engineer
 Prince – arranger, audio production, engineer, mixing, producer, remixing, string arrangements, various instruments, vocals
 Prince & the Revolution – guest artist
 David Rivkin – engineer
 Susan Rogers – engineer
 Bob Rosa – mixing
 Levi Seacer Jr. – bass, rhythm guitar, vocals, background vocals
 Sheila E. – drums, Percussion, remixing, vocals
 The Steeles – Main Personnel
 Sonny T. – bass, background vocals
 David Tickle – engineer
 Junior Vasquez – editing
 Larry E. Williams – tray photo
 Laury Woods – viola
 Bobby Z – percussion

Promo versions
A two disc promo version of Ultimate Prince was sent to radio stations and record stores in Spring 2006. This version has a different track listing from the official release. The promo features a few songs not on the official release, though it excludes the "Let's Work" remix. The promo also presents the songs in rough chronological order as opposed to separating out the remixes. The two disc version is speculated to be the first track listing; Prince later changed the track listing to remove some of the explicit language.

Two disc promo

In-house promo sampler
 "Purple Medley"
 "I Wanna Be Your Lover"
 "Little Red Corvette" (Dance Mix)
 "Let's Go Crazy" (Special Dance Mix)
 "Erotic City" (12" Version)
 "Kiss" (Extended Version)
 "Money Don't Matter 2 Night"
 "Cream"

Charts

Weekly charts

Monthly charts

Year-end charts

Certifications

References

2006 greatest hits albums
Prince (musician) compilation albums
Albums produced by Prince (musician)
Warner Records compilation albums
Rhino Records compilation albums